Peyto Peak is a mountain in the Waputik Range, part of the Canadian Rockies in Alberta, Canada. Five kilometres to the northeast lies Bow Pass, one of the high points of the Icefields Parkway. Between the peak and the pass lies picturesque Peyto Lake. Three kilometres southwest of Peyto Peak is Mount Baker, the highest point in the immediate vicinity.

History
Peyto Peak was named in 1896 by Walter Wilcox for Ebenezer William "Bill" Peyto, an early outfitter, trail guide and trapper in the Banff and Lake Louise areas. The first ascent of the peak was in 1933 by famed mountaineer Conrad Kain and party. The mountain's name became official in 1928 by the Geographical Names Board of Canada.

Geology

Like other mountains in Banff Park, Peyto Peak is composed of sedimentary rock laid down during the Precambrian to Jurassic periods. Formed in shallow seas, this sedimentary rock was pushed east and over the top of younger rock during the Laramide orogeny.

Climate

Based on the Köppen climate classification, Peyto Peak is located in a subarctic climate with cold, snowy winters, and mild summers.

See also
List of mountains of Canada

References

Additional Sources

External links
 Parks Canada web site: Banff National Park
 Peyto Peak weather: Mountain Forecast
 Flickr photo: Peyto Peak from Caldron Lake

Peyto Peak
Peyto Peak
Canadian Rockies